Ceryx barombina is a moth of the subfamily Arctiinae. It was described by Max Gaede in 1926. It is found in Cameroon.

References

Endemic fauna of Cameroon
Ceryx (moth)
Moths described in 1926
Insects of Cameroon
Moths of Africa